Coenomyia ferruginea is a species of fly in the family Xylophagidae.

Distribution
Europe, North America.

References

Xylophagidae
Insects described in 1763
Diptera of Europe
Diptera of North America
Taxa named by Giovanni Antonio Scopoli